Warwick Banks (born 12 July 1939) is a British former auto racing driver. He was a race winner in British Formula Three for Tyrrell Racing during the 1960s and was teammate of Jackie Stewart during his first season in 1964. He won the European Touring Car Championship in 1964, and in 1965 he finished runner-up in the British Saloon Car Championship with a class-winning Austin Mini Cooper S.

Racing record

Complete British Saloon Car Championship results
(key) (Races in bold indicate pole position; races in italics indicate fastest lap.)

† Events with 2 races staged for the different classes.

References

External links
Warwick Banks at driver database.

1939 births
Living people
British Formula Three Championship drivers
British Touring Car Championship drivers
European Touring Car Championship drivers